DanceSafe is a nonprofit organization, with 17  local chapters in the US and Canada. DanceSafe youth volunteers set up tables at music festivals, raves, and other events to distribute non-biased educational literature focused on harm reduction for safe and responsible drug use, including testing kits so that users may obtain more information about the contents of their pills. They also offer on site peer counseling, health and safety tools (Condoms, water, earplugs) and patrols for events that assist in keeping patrons safe.

DanceSafe was founded in 1998 by Emanuel Sferios. He resigned in 2001. Bryan Oley served as Board President and Executive director from 2001–2009, Nathan Messer from 2009–2012, Melissa "Missi" Wooldridge from 2012–2016 and is currently headed by Mitchell Gomez.  DanceSafe currently has a four-member board of directors who oversee the operations of the organization.

Emanuel Sferios, the founder of DanceSafe, claims that his organization has saved lives by preventing young people from taking the more dangerous adulterated pills and by educating them.

On March 31, 2017 DanceSafe was part of a coalition of drug safety organisations hosting the first-ever International Drug Checking Day to raise awareness of safer drug use. The initiative was aimed at recreational users, with a particular emphasis on the nightlife community, and aims to promote harm reduction—accepting that people will choose to take drugs, and providing them with tools to minimize the risks.

Laboratory adulterant screening
Since 1999, DanceSafe has manufactured and sold consumer drug checking kits as part of their harm reduction services for users. DanceSafe also offers on-site pill testing services at harm reduction booths at electronic music events in the United States and Canada. DanceSafe coordinates with event promoters before offering on-site testing services, since some provisions of the so-called Rave Act laws hold organizers and venue owners liable for drug use at their events.

DanceSafe's consumer laboratory pill analysis program was taken over by the Erowid Center in 2001, who now offers drug analysis services for pills and other psychoactive substances through DrugsData (formerly EctstasyData). Erowid is an educational non-profit that receives additional support from several organizations, including DanceSafe. Lab fees for testing vary depending on the form of the substance (powder, pharmaceutical tablet, or street table) and include DEA-approved disposal of substances. The project accepts donations to support drug checking and pill-testing. All testing results since the beginning of the program in 1998 are available for review on DrugData.org.

Harm Reduction 
In addition to the work at raves and other events, DanceSafe ran an online harm-reduction 'booth' from 2001–2010. The Booth's administrator was Bryan Oley. In 2013, Dancesafe co-hosted the 8th International Club Health conference in San Francisco  that included Academic, law enforcement, Harm Reduction and Health agencies from over 17 countries across the world.

Dancesafe was also the first Youth Harm Reduction organization to officially partner with the ID&T/SFX Partnered "TomorrowWorld" festival held in Chattahoochee Hills, GA.  The first partnership of its kind, it was hallmarked by the festivals extremely low rate of medical emergencies and lack of deaths.

References

External links

 The DanceSafe homepage
 The EcstasyData.org homepage
 The Harm Reduction Coalition homepage
 Information and harm reduction strategies for ecstasy and other illicit drugs

Drug culture
Prevention associations